The following outline is provided as an overview of and topical guide to epistemology:

Epistemology or theory of knowledge –  branch of philosophy concerned with the nature and scope of knowledge. The term was introduced into English by the Scottish philosopher James Frederick Ferrier (1808–1864).  Epistemology asks the questions: "What is knowledge?", "How is knowledge acquired?", and "What do people know?"

Core topics of epistemology

 Knowledge
 Gettier problem
 Sources of knowledge
 Perception
 Memory
 Introspection
 Inference
 Testimony
 Types of knowledge
 Descriptive knowledge - "Knowledge that"
 Procedural knowledge - "Knowledge how"
 Knowledge by acquaintance
 A priori and a posteriori
 Analytic-synthetic distinction
 Internalism and externalism
 Justification
 Foundationalism – Self-evident basic beliefs justify other non-basic beliefs.
 Coherentism – Beliefs are justified if they cohere with other beliefs a person holds, each belief is justified if it coheres with the overall system of beliefs.
 Infinitism
 Regress argument
 Truth
 Criteria of truth
 Belief
 Empiricism
 Rationalism
 Skepticism
 Contextualism
 Fallibilism
 Innatism
 Naïve realism
 Phenomenalism
 Positivism
 Reductionism
 Reliabilism

Branches of epistemology 

 Formal epistemology – subdiscipline of epistemology that uses formal methods from logic, probability theory and computability theory to elucidate traditional epistemic problems.
 Meta-epistemology – metaphilosophical study of the subject, matter, methods and aims of epistemology and of approaches to understanding and structuring our knowledge of knowledge itself.
 Social epistemology – the study of collective knowledge and the social dimensions of knowledge
 Naturalized epistemology

See also

Outline of philosophy

References

External links

 What Is Epistemology? – a brief introduction to the topic by Keith DeRose.
 The Epistemological Lifeboat by Birger Hjørland &  Jeppe Nicolaisen (eds.)
 Epistemology Papers – a collection of Michael Huemer's papers.
 Teaching Theory of Knowledge (1986) – Marjorie Clay (ed.), an electronic publication from The Council for Philosophical Studies.
 Epistemology: The Philosophy of Knowledge – an introduction at Groovyweb.
 The Peripatetic – A practical introduction to the theory of knowledge
 A Theory of Knowledge by Clóvis Juarez Kemmerich, on the Social Science Research Network, 2006.
 On a Critical Epistemology
 Language Perception and Action: Philosophical Issues

 Justification
 Stanford Encyclopedia of Philosophy entry on Foundationalist Theories of Epistemic Justification
 Stanford Encyclopedia of Philosophy entry on Epistemology, 2. What is Justification?
 Stanford Encyclopedia of Philosophy entry on Public Justification
 Stanford Encyclopedia of Philosophy entry on Internalist vs. Externalist Conceptions of Epistemic Justification
 Stanford Encyclopedia of Philosophy entry on Coherentist Theories of Epistemic Justification

Epistemology
Epistemology